MSSI may refer to:

 Marvell Software Solutions Israel
 Master of Science of Strategic Intelligence degree, as offered by the National Intelligence University
 Microsoft Shared Source Initiative
 Military Service for Security and Intelligence, Macedonia
 Mont Saint-Sauveur International